Water polo events were contested at the 1987 Summer Universiade in Zagreb, Yugoslavia.

References
 Universiade water polo medalists on HickokSports

1987 Summer Universiade
Universiade
1987
1987 Summer Universiade